Sarah Helen Prescott is Professor of English Literature at Aberystwyth University and a non-fiction writer, specializing in the history of Welsh literature in English. She is also the director of the university's Institute of Literature, Languages and Creative Arts (ILLCA).

Biography
After earning a B.A. at the University of York, Prescott continued her studies at the University of Exeter where she received a PhD in 1997 with a thesis titled Feminist Literary History and British Women Novelists of the 1720s. Since the mid-1990s she has been an educator at Aberystwyth University where she has also conducted research into women's poetry, Welsh writing in English, and women's writing in Wales. In addition to two books on 18th-century female writers, she has contributed to journals including Modern Philology, Huntington Library Quarterly, Eighteenth-Century Studies and Notes and Queries. She serves on the editorial board of Literature Compass and is a member of the Institute for Medieval and Early Modern Studies covering work in the English Departments of Aberystwyth and the University of Wales, Bangor. She has also collaborated with Professor Jane Aaron of the University of Glamorgan on the third volume of the Oxford Literary History of Wales which covers "Welsh Writing in English, 1536–1914".

Prescott is also Director of Aberystwyth University's Institute of Literature, Languages and the Creative Arts (ILLCA) which comprises the Aberystwyth Arts Centre. In collaboration with Aberystwyth University's Welsh and Celtic Studies Department, the University of Edinburgh and the National University of Ireland, Galway, since February 2013 she has been involved in a three-year project funded by the Leverhulme Trust on "Women’s Poetry 1400-1800 from Ireland, Scotland and Wales in Irish, English, Scots, Scottish Gaelic, and Welsh".

Selected works

Awards
In 2013, Prescott was awarded the M. Wynn Thomas Prize for her essay "Archipelagic Coterie Space: Katherine Philips and Welsh Women’s Writing".

References

External links
Saraprescott's page at Aberystwyth University

1970s births
Living people
20th-century British educators
21st-century British educators
21st-century British writers
21st-century British women writers
20th-century women educators
21st-century women educators
Academics of Aberystwyth University
Alumni of the University of Exeter
Alumni of the University of York
Literary scholars
British women academics